Saint-Martin-de-Seignanx (Gascon: Sent Martin de Senhans) is a commune in the Landes department in Nouvelle-Aquitaine in southwestern France.

Population

International relations
Saint-Martin-de-Seignanx is a sister city of the Spanish town Oyón-Oion.

See also
Communes of the Landes department

References

Communes of Landes (department)